Çaylı is a town in Ödemiş district of İzmir Province, Turkey. The population of the town is 1802. as of 2010. The earliest records about the settlement are of the 17th century. In 1975 it was declared a seat of township. Main crops are olive and figs. There is also a dairy in the town.

References

Populated places in İzmir Province
Towns in Turkey
Ödemiş District